Frederico Rodrigues de Paula Santos (born 5 March 1993), known as Fred, is a Brazilian professional footballer who plays as a midfielder for  club Manchester United and the Brazil national team.

Fred started his career at Brazilian club Internacional, where he won the Campeonato Gaúcho twice. In June 2013, he signed for Ukrainian club Shakhtar Donetsk, where he won three Ukrainian Premier League titles. In 2018, Fred signed for Manchester United where he won an EFL Cup in 2023.

Fred represented Brazil at under-20 and under-23 levels. He made his senior international debut in November 2014. He was part of Brazil's squad for the 2015 Copa América in Chile, starting in their first two Group C matches as they reached the quarter-finals. He was also named in Brazil's final squads for the 2018 and the 2022 FIFA World Cups, and the 2021 Copa América.

Club career

Early career
Born in Belo Horizonte, Fred spent six years of his childhood at local club Atlético Mineiro, before joining Porto Alegre in 2009. One year later, he joined Internacional. He initially represented the club at various youth levels and helped them win six titles in 2010, including the Copa Santiago and Copa FGF. He made his professional debut aged 18 on 26 January 2012, against Cerâmica in the Campeonato Gaúcho. He scored his first goal in professional football on 18 July 2012, in a Série A game against his former club Atlético Mineiro. Overall, he scored eight goals in 55 appearances for Internacional and won the Campeonato Gaúcho twice.

Shakhtar Donetsk

On 26 June 2013, Fred signed for Ukrainian team Shakhtar Donetsk in a deal worth €15 million. He scored two goals on his competitive debut in the Ukrainian Super Cup, helping Shakhtar to a 3–1 victory over Chornomorets Odesa.

During the Russo-Ukrainian War, Fred was among the six Shakhtar players who refused to return to Donetsk in July 2014 following a pre-season friendly against Olympique Lyonnais in France. A few days later, he returned to Ukraine after the club relocated training sessions to Kyiv.

On 21 February 2018, Fred scored a free-kick, his first goal in the UEFA Champions League, in a 2–1 round of 16 first-leg victory against AS Roma.

With Shakhtar, Fred won 10 trophies, including three Ukrainian Premier League titles.

Manchester United

2018–2019: Transfer and first matches

On 5 June 2018, Premier League club Manchester United reached an agreement to sign Fred for a reported fee of £47 million. He agreed a five-year contract with the option to extend for a further year. Fred formed a midfield partnership with Scott McTominay which came to be dubbed the ‘McFred’ partnership by the media and football fans. 

On 11 August, he made his club debut in a 2–1 victory over Leicester City in their first league game of the season. Fred scored his first goal for United against Wolverhampton Wanderers on 22 September 2018, in a 1–1 league draw at home.

2019–2021
On 7 December 2019, Fred was allegedly racially abused by Manchester City fans during the Manchester derby. On 27 February 2020, Fred scored two goals and assisted another in United's UEFA Europa League round of 32 match against Club Brugge, which they won 5–0 and 6–1 on aggregate.

On 2 February 2021, Fred played a full 90 minutes in Manchester United's Premier League record-equalling 9–0 home win against Southampton. On 11 April 2021, Fred scored the equalising goal at the 57th minute in Manchester United's Premier League game against Tottenham Hotspur, in which the Red Devils won 3–1, after Spurs's Son Heung-min scored at the 40th minute of the match.

2021–2022
On the opening matchday of the 2021–22 Premier League, Fred scored Manchester United's fifth goal in a 5–1 win over Leeds United, with an assist from Paul Pogba. He then scored an own goal in a 1–1 draw against Southampton by deflecting a Ché Adams shot. On 5 December 2021, he scored the winning goal for Manchester United in their 1-0 win against Crystal Palace. Fred scored this goal outside the box with his weaker right foot, in Ralf Rangnick’s first match as Manchester United manager. On 20 February 2022, Fred scored the third goal in Manchester United’s 4-2 win over Leeds United.

2022–2023
On 20 December 2022, Fred's contract with the club was extended until 2024.

On 23 February 2023, Fred scored the first goal for the Manchester United side in a 2-1 win against FC Barcelona in the second leg of the UEFA Europa League. On 26 February 2023, Fred won the 2022-23 EFL Cup with Manchester United. Under manager Erik ten Hag, Fred has often been described as being in the best form of his career.

International career
Fred played three times for the Brazil under-20 team at the 2013 South American Youth Football Championship. He played two games for the under-23 team in November 2015, both of which were against the United States.

He made his debut for the Brazil national team on 12 November 2014, as a substitute in a 4–0 victory over Turkey in Istanbul. Due to an injury to Luiz Gustavo, Fred was called up to Brazil's squad for the 2015 Copa América in Chile, starting in their first two Group C matches as they reached the quarter-finals.

He was initially selected in the Brazil under-23 squad for the 2016 Olympic Games. However, he was not released to play in the tournament by Shakhtar Donetsk and was replaced in the squad by Walace.

In May 2018, he was named in Tite's final 23-man squad for the 2018 FIFA World Cup in Russia, but failed to make an appearance at the tournament.

In June 2021, he was included in Brazil's squad for the 2021 Copa América on home soil.

On 7 November 2022, Fred was named in the squad for the 2022 FIFA World Cup.

Doping case
Fred tested positive for the banned diuretic hydrochlorothiazide in a sample collected during the 2015 Copa América. In July 2015, he released a statement claiming he was innocent, while awaiting the results of a second sample. Shakhtar Donetsk were cleared by UEFA to select him at the start of the 2015–16 season, after a complaint by Fenerbahçe over his appearance in a Champions League third qualifying round game.

On 15 December 2015, he received a one-year suspension from CONMEBOL, preventing him from playing in any CONMEBOL sanctioned games, but allowing him to continue playing for Shakhtar. On 5 February 2016, FIFA extended the ban to cover all football worldwide for one year, backdated to 27 June 2015. In March 2016, the World Anti-Doping Agency (WADA) appealed to the Court of Arbitration for Sport (CAS) against the ban, believing it to be potentially lenient. In March 2017, after Fred had returned from the suspension, an agreement was reached with WADA before the CAS hearing that resulted in him being unable to play football until July 2017.

Style of play
Fred is renowned for his defensive presence as well as his playmaking ability.

Career statistics

Club

International

Honours
Internacional
Campeonato Gaúcho: 2012, 2013

Shakhtar Donetsk
Ukrainian Premier League: 2013–14, 2016–17, 2017–18
Ukrainian Cup: 2017–18
Ukrainian Super Cup: 2013, 2015

Manchester United
EFL Cup: 2022–23
UEFA Europa League runner-up: 2020–21

Brazil
Copa América runner-up: 2021

Individual
UEFA Europa League Squad of the Season: 2019–20

References

External links

Manchester United profile

1993 births
Living people
Footballers from Belo Horizonte
Brazilian footballers
Association football midfielders
Sport Club Internacional players
FC Shakhtar Donetsk players
Manchester United F.C. players
Campeonato Brasileiro Série A players
Ukrainian Premier League players
Premier League players
Brazil youth international footballers
Brazil international footballers
2015 Copa América players
2018 FIFA World Cup players
2021 Copa América players
2022 FIFA World Cup players
Brazilian expatriate footballers
Brazilian expatriate sportspeople in Ukraine
Brazilian expatriate sportspeople in England
Expatriate footballers in Ukraine
Expatriate footballers in England
Doping cases in association football
Brazilian sportspeople in doping cases